Gengasaurus is an extinct genus of ophthalmosaurid ichthyosaur from the Jurassic. The type and only species, Gengasaurus nicosiai, was named in 2017, after the locality of Genga, Marche. It lived in Italy about 152 million years ago.

History
The near complete holotype was discovered in 1976 in the Late Jurassic (Tithonian) Calcari ad aptici e Saccocoma Formation at Camponocecchio and it was described in 1980 and 2000  as the "Genga ichthyosaur" before it was named and described in 2016 - this paper was eventually published in 2017. The holotype is now housed at the Spaelaeo-Palaeontologic Museum in Genga.

Phylogeny
The following cladogram shows a possible phylogenetic position of Gengasaurus in Ophthalmosauridae according to the analysis performed by Zverkov and Jacobs (2020).

References 

Ophthalmosaurinae
Tithonian life
Late Jurassic ichthyosaurs
Ichthyosaurs of Europe
Late Jurassic reptiles of Europe
Jurassic Italy
Fossils of Italy
Fossil taxa described in 2017
Ichthyosauromorph genera